Wallace Aiken Scott (July 4, 1924 – February 8, 2003) was an American aviator and author, a holder of several international sailplane records, and a multi-time recipient of the Lewin B. Barringer trophy awarded for the longest, free-distance, sailplane flight of each year made in the United States. Over 36 years Wallace Wally Scott increased the distance flown in a sailplane.

Scott became a pioneer of free-distance, straight-out, soaring flight and won 4 Fédération Aéronautique Internationale (FAI)-certified, world soaring records, 20 Lewin B. Barringer Trophies, and numerous other awards and honors, including induction into the Soaring Hall of Fame in 1965.

Scott flew various sailplanes more than 300,000 miles while twice winning the transcontinental Smirnoff Sailplane Derby race, the longest sailplane race in the world.  On July 26, 1970, he and Ben Greene co-set the world distance record of 716.95 miles, both flying ASW-12 sailplanes.

Early years
Scott was born on July 4, 1924, in Van Horn, Texas, the son of Claude Winfred and Maggie Elizabeth Scott.  He had four siblings and the family left Van Horn in 1926 and moved to Best, Texas, when Scott was two years old.  The economy eventually forced the Scott family to move north to Odessa, Texas when Scott was age 12.  Here they established the family’s successful movie theatre business.

Early aviation career
Scott learned to fly at Fort Stockton, Texas where his brother, Oliver "Scotty", taught him to fly. His brother had become an instructor with the Civilian Pilot Training Program in Fort Stockton. Scott later wrote, “On October 2, 1942, the day after my introductory flight, O. E. Scott "Scotty", logged for W.A. Scott thirty minutes of dual in Cub J-2.”

In 1943, Scott earned his pilot’s license and, with his brother's help, he became a flight instructor at the Fort Stockton detachment of Pacific Air Schools, Ltd. Scott taught his sixth and final class of cadets in January 1944 and by March had left Fort Stockton and joined the Ferry Command branch of the Army Air Corps.

World War II experiences
Scott was accepted to go to Randolph Field in San Antonio, Texas and to attend flight school in order to obtain an aircraft instrument rating. After graduation, he reported to Nashville, Tennessee to continue his training with Ferry Command. After completing his training, Scott was assigned to Palm Springs, California and served as a co-pilot on the Boeing B-17 Flying Fortress, Douglas C-47 Skytrain and Douglas C-49.

In August and September 1944, Scott participated in several domestic evacuation flights, taking wounded soldiers from the Pacific coast to the eastern United States and vice versa. On October 18, 1944, he was assigned to a C-47 to be ferried from Bangor, Maine to join the Air Transport group based at Le Bourget in Paris, France. Scott’s duties while based at Le Bourget included delivering supplies to airfields near the front lines and flying wounded personnel to England.

In February 1945, Scott was transferred to Dum Dum Airfield on the northeastern edge of Calcutta, India and away from the front lines. Dum Dum airfield served as a major supply point for ferrying supplies to Chiang Kai-shek’s forces in Kunming, China. Scott flew cargo and personnel over The Hump from in both Curtiss-Wright C-46 Commandos and C-47 aircraft. With the war over, on December 16, 1945, Scott returned to the United States.

Marriage and children

After returning to the United States, Scott met Beverly "Boots" Mae Jackson in January 1946 and they were married on May 12, 1946.  Between December 1947 and April 1951 they had four children, a son and daughter and twin girls.

Glider flying
In the mid-1950s, Scott and his wife took up archery . In 1956, as president of the Permian Basin Archery Club, Scott won the highest score of any instinctive archer in the National Field Archery Association’s Championship Tournament in San Antonio, Texas. His wife also developed into an expert archer in her own right, and they would eventually win the husband/wife team trophy in the state championships in Odessa in 1959 with Boots’ individual, second-place finish.

Archery was eventually put on hold when Scott began flying powered aircraft again. In March 1961, Scott took his first flight in a glider and within a few months he had purchased a new Schweizer SGS 1-26 sailplane.

Scott’s first record flight was an 8.5 hour, dog-leg flight from Odessa, Texas to near Clayton, New Mexico flown on August 6, 1963. He placed 2nd in his first major soaring competition, the 31st Annual National Soaring Championships, which was held from June 29 to July 9, 1964 in McCook, Nebraska.

Scott purchased a variety of sailplanes over the next several decades, and competed in several national and World Gliding Championships in different  glider competition classes.

Later life and death
In the late 1990s Scott mostly flew locally until January 7, 1999, when he underwent surgery on his knee. The surgery would weaken both his body and spirit. Scott was eventually diagnosed with Alzheimer's disease and never flew again. On February 8, 2003, Scott died in Odessa, Texas, at the age of 78 after contracting pneumonia; he had flown nearly 7,000 hours and over 300,000 miles in sailplanes during his life.

Awards and soaring records

World soaring records 
National Aeronautic Association and Fédération Aéronautique Internationale (FAI) Awards:

Articles authored
 443.5 Miles by 1-26 N8606R, Soaring Magazine, October 1963
 The Second 500, Soaring Magazine, November 1967
 Marfa Report, circa 1970, self-published, a report on how to soar in the areas of southwest Texas, specifically around Marfa, TX
 Showdown Over Gila Bend, The account of his world record 605-mile goal distance flight, Soaring Magazine, January 1970 by Douglas Lamont
  The Big One, by Wallace Scott and Ben Greene, Soaring Magazine, February 1971
  The 1976 Smirnoff Derby, Soaring Magazine, August 1976
  The Preparation and Execution of Long-Distance Flights, Soaring Magazine, June 1982
  Attack on Aconcagua, by Wallace Scott and Guido Haymann, Soaring Magazine, May/June 1986

References

Bibliography
 Hilbert Thomas, Samantha. WA-the life of soaring legend Wally Scott. BTLink Publishing, 2010 
 Soaring Magazine Archives, Soaring Society of America

1924 births
2003 deaths
Aviators from Texas
Glider pilots
People from Culberson County, Texas
United States Army Air Forces pilots of World War II
Deaths from pneumonia in Texas
Glider flight record holders
American aviation record holders
Military personnel from Texas